Shipitsyno is a rural locality (a village) in Sizemskoye Rural Settlement, Sheksninsky District, Vologda Oblast, Russia. The population was 5 as of 2002.

Geography 
Shipitsyno is located 42 km northeast of Sheksna (the district's administrative centre) by road. Popovskoye is the nearest rural locality.

References 

Rural localities in Sheksninsky District